Elkatawa is an unincorporated community and coal town in Breathitt County, Kentucky, United States.

A post office was established in 1891, with Eli C. Jones postmaster. The name Elkatawa is possibly a corruption of Tenskwatawa.

References

Unincorporated communities in Breathitt County, Kentucky
Unincorporated communities in Kentucky
Coal towns in Kentucky